The ARIS concept (Architecture of Integrated Information Systems) by August-Wilhelm Scheer aims to ensure that an enterprise information system can completely meet its requirements.

This framework is based on a division of the model into description views and levels, which allows a description of the individual elements through specially designed methods, without having to include the entire model. The methodology serves as a systems development life cycle for mapping and optimizing business processes. These processes are mapped for each description view, starting with the business management question up to the implementation on data processing level.

ARIS house (description views)
ARIS relies mainly on its own five-view architecture (ARIS house). These five views are based on organization, data, service, functional and process views of a process. The classification is made to break down the complexity of the model into five facets and thus make business process modeling simpler.

Each view of the ARIS concept represents the model of a business process under a specific aspect:

Function view: The activities and the groupings and hierarchical relationships that exist between them are described in the function view, for example in a function tree. Since functions support goals and are controlled by them, goals are also assigned to the function view
Organization view: It provides an overview of the organizational structure of a company, including human resources, machines, hardware and their relationships, see also Organizational chart
Data view:  All events (that generate data) and environmental data, such as correspondence, documents, etc., i.e. all company-relevant information objects, see also Entity Relationship Model
Product/Service view:  Provides an overview of the entire product/service portfolio (incl. services, products, financial)
Process view: The process view connects all other views into a time-logical schedule, for example in an event-driven process chain or BPMN

Description levels 
Each description view of the ARIS house is divided into three description levels:

Concept

Structured representation of the business processes by means of description models that are understandable for the business side (depending on the view, e.g.: ERM, EPC,       organization chart, function tree)

Data Concept (= data processing concept, IT concept)

Implementation of the technical concept in IT-related description models (depending on the view e.g. relations, structure charts, topologies)

Implementation

IT-technical realization of the described process parts (depending on the view, e.g. by creating program code, database systems, use of protocols)

Dissemination and related work 
The ARIS concept forms the basis of various software products, such as the ARIS Toolset from Software AG, which has been the owner of ARIS trademarks since IDS Scheer AG was acquired. At the end of 2004, part of the concept was reflected in the graphical process integration of SAP Exchange Infrastructure.

ARIS is a very well-known approach for the description of information system architectures, especially in German-speaking countries. As a concept of the Management Frameworks group, however, it is one of over fifty existing frameworks for information management on the market. The architecture of interoperable information systems (AIOS) was also published in 2010 at the Institut für Wirtschaftsinformatik (Institute for Information Systems) in Saarbrücken, which was founded by Scheer. While ARIS describes company-internal information systems and business processes, AIOS describes how cross-company business processes can be realized by adapting and loosely coupling information systems.

With the "Model-to-Execute" approach, business processes can be modelled in ARIS and automatically transferred to webMethods BPM for technical execution.

Applications
As one of the Enterprise Modeling methods, ARIS provides four different aspects of applications:
 The ARIS concept 
is the architecture for describing business processes.
 provides modelling methods, the meta structures of which are comprised in information models.
 is the foundation for the ARIS Toolset software system for the support of modelling.
 The ARIS house of Business Engineering (HOBE) represents a concept for comprehensive computer-aided Business Process Management.

Examples

See also
 ARIS Express, free modeling tool by Software AG
 Architecture of Interoperable Information Systems
 DRAKON

References

Further reading 

 Ulrich Frank (2002) "Multi-Perspective Enterprise Modeling (MEMO) Conceptual Framework and Modeling Languages" Universität Koblenz-Landau; Rheinau 1, D-56075 Koblenz, Germany
 Thomas R. Gulledge and Rainer A. Sommer (1999) "Process Coupling in Business Process Engineering" George Mason University, USA. Knowledge and Process Management Volume 6 Number 3 pp 158–165
 Henk Jonkers, Marc Lankhorst, et al. (2004) "Concepts for Modeling Enterprise Architectures" Telematica Instituut, the Netherlands; University of Nijmegen, Nijmegen, the Netherlands; Leiden Institute for Advanced Computer Science, Leiden, the Netherlands; CWI, Amsterdam, the Netherlands
 August-Wilhelm Scheer, Markus Nüttgens "ARIS Architecture and Reference Models for Business Process Management" Institut für Wirtschaftsinformatik, Universität des Saarlandes, Im Stadtwald Geb. 14.1, D-66123 Saarbrücken
 August-Wilhelm Scheer (1996) "ARIS-Toolset:Von Forschungs-Prototypen zum Produkt" Informatik-Spektrum 19: 71–78 (1996) © Springer-Verlag 1996
 August-Wilhelm Scheer: Architektur integrierter Informationssysteme. Springer, Berlin 1992, .
 August-Wilhelm Scheer, Wolfram Jost: ARIS in der Praxis. Springer, Berlin 2002, .
 Jörg Krüger, Christian Uhlig: Praxis der Geschäftsprozessmodellierung - ARIS erfolgreich anwenden. VDE-Verlag, Berlin 2009, .
 Dirk Matthes: . 2011. Auflage. Springer Science+Business Media, 2011, .
 Thomas Allweyer: Geschäftsprozessmanagement. W3L, Bochum 2005, .
 Rob Davis, Eric Brabaender: ARIS Design Platform: Getting Started with BPM. Springer, London 2007, .
 Rob Davis: ARIS Design Platform: Advanced Process Modelling and Administration. Springer, London 2008, .
 Peter Stahlknecht, Ulrich Hasenkamp: Einführung in die Wirtschaftsinformatik. 11. Auflage. Springer, Berlin 2005, .

External links 

 Software AG product page
 ARIS Community official ARIS community by Software AG
 From Event-driven modeling to Process monitoring. Presentation by Helge Hess, IDS Scheer, 2006.

Enterprise architecture frameworks
Enterprise modelling
Software AG